Michael Ovella Ochieng (born 23 December 1999) is a Kenyan international footballer who plays for Vasalund, as a striker.

Career
Ochieng has played club football for Kariobangi Sharks and Vasalund.

He made his international debut for Kenya in 2016. He scored his first ever goal in his career, in the match against New Zealand in Intercontinental Cup held in India. Kenya won 2–1.

International goals

References

1999 births
Living people
Kenyan footballers
Association football forwards
F.C. Kariobangi Sharks players
Vasalunds IF players
Kenyan National Super League players
Kenyan Premier League players
Ettan Fotboll players
Kenya international footballers
2019 Africa Cup of Nations players
Kenyan expatriate footballers
Kenyan expatriate sportspeople in Sweden
Expatriate footballers in Sweden